This is a list of the Irish MPs who were co-opted from the former Parliament of Ireland, to serve as members of the 1st UK Parliament from Ireland, or who were elected at subsequent by-elections. There were 100 seats representing Ireland in this Parliament.

The United Kingdom came into existence on 1 January 1801, so the terms of all the original Westminster MPs from Ireland are deemed to begin on that date. The 1st United Kingdom Parliament assembled on 22 January 1801 and was dissolved on 29 June 1802 (a length of one year, five months and seven days).

Summary of MPs by party (Ireland only)
The names of MPs and votes for candidates at by-elections are based on Walker. Party labels are based on those used by Stooks Smith and may differ from those in other sources. Many early nineteenth century Irish MPs are not classified by party, by Stooks Smith.

In some cases, when a party label is used for the MP by Stooks Smith in a subsequent Parliament, this is noted in the Members list below.

Members by constituency
The list is given in alphabetical order by constituency. The County prefixes used for county constituencies is disregarded in determining alphabetical order, but the county follows any borough or city constituency with the same name.

The name of an MP who served during the Parliament, but who was not the holder of a seat at the dissolution in 1802, is given in italics. When the date of the election is in italics, this indicates a by-election.

No election took place on 1 January 1801. The MPs for constituencies which retained two members after the Union (the thirty two counties and the cities of Cork and Dublin), continued in office. In the remaining seats, which were reduced from two MPs to one, there was a drawing of lots to determine which member served at Westminster. If one seat in the Parliament of Ireland was vacant, the remaining member continued in office. If both seats were vacant, then a United Kingdom by-election was held to fill the vacancy.

Notes

See also
Duration of English, British and United Kingdom parliaments from 1660
List of parliaments of the United Kingdom
List of United Kingdom by-elections (1801–1806)
First Parliament of the United Kingdom

References

 The Parliaments of England by Henry Stooks Smith (1st edition published in three volumes 1844–50), second edition edited (in one volume) by F. W. S. Craig (Political Reference Publications 1973)
 

 
 
1801 in Ireland